Pedro Fontainhas Prazeres (born 3 June 1997) is a Portuguese footballer who plays for Vianense as a forward.

Football career
He made his professional debut for Penafiel on 14 September 2020 in the Liga Portugal 2.

References

External links

1997 births
People from Valença, Portugal
Sportspeople from Viana do Castelo District
Living people
Portuguese footballers
Association football forwards
A.D. Sanjoanense players
Leça F.C. players
F.C. Penafiel players
Associação Académica de Coimbra – O.A.F. players
SC Vianense players
Campeonato de Portugal (league) players
Liga Portugal 2 players